Giovanni Battista Lorenzi (Verona, 1741– January 27, 1773) was an Italian painter of the Rococo period.

Biography
He trained in Verona under Gianbettino Cignaroli. He mainly painted sacred subjects and some portraits. He died from alcoholism.

References

1741 births
1773 deaths
18th-century Italian painters
Italian male painters
Rococo painters
Painters from Verona
18th-century Italian male artists